Chữ Hán (𡨸漢, literally "Han characters"), chữ Nho (𡨸儒, literally "Confucian characters") or Hán tự (漢字), is the Vietnamese term for Chinese characters, used to write Văn ngôn (which is a form of Classical Chinese used in Vietnam during the feudal period) and Sino-Vietnamese vocabulary in Vietnamese language, was officially used in Vietnam after the Red River Delta region was incorporated into the Han dynasty and continued to be used until the early 20th century (111 BC – 1919 AD).

Terminology 

 Stroke – nét
 Stroke order – Bút thuận (筆順)
 Radical – Bộ thủ (部首)
 Regular script – Khải thư (楷書)
 Simplified characters – chữ giản thể (𡨸簡體)
 Traditional characters – chữ phồn thể (𡨸繁體)
 Văn ngôn – Literary Chinese (文言)
 Hán văn – synonym of Literary Chinese (漢文)
 Kangxi radicals – Bộ thủ Khang Hi

History 

In the late 3rd century BC, the newly established Qin dynasty made a number of military raids to the south, establishing control over the Baiyue peoples. Three military commanderies were established far to the south in 214. Xiang commandery covered parts of present-day North Vietnam. However, Qin control of the area was short-lived, as the Qin dynasty collapsed in the last decade of the century. Zhao Tuo (Triệu Đà), one of the generals commissioned by the Qin dynasty, gained control of the area in 207 BC and founded a kingdom called Nanyue (Southern Yue) in 204 BC. A few decades later, during the Han dynasty (206 BCE – 220 CE), Nanyue became a vassal state, and it operated independently of the Han dynasty. Administered by the Chinese aristocracy, the state introduced Chinese administrative and cultural practices to the area. The bureaucracy is complex and pervasive, dependent on written transfers and record keeping. It can be safely assumed that a substantial number of speakers of the Yue languages ​​have become familiar, if not completely proficient, with the Chinese script. For the government to function, it must rely on Yue speakers who can speak and write Chinese. The identities of the various Yue languages are not known, but almost certainly include members of the Tai-Kadai and Mon-Khmer language families. Among the languages spoken in the Lingnan region that are similar to present-day Northern Vietnam is the ancestral language of present-day Vietnamese, Proto-Viet-Muong.

In BCE, the Han dynasty conquered Nanyue, incorporating its territory directly into the imperial administrative system. And after quelling a Vietnamese uprising in 42 AD, an exodus of Han soldiers into the Red River Delta region of northern Vietnam created a community of Chinese-speaking families. For the next millennium, northern Vietnam was under continuous direct control of successive Chinese dynasties, with only brief interruptions, until the early 10th century AD. This area of Vietnam, centered on the Red River Delta, is known to the Chinese as Jiaozhi. Chinese writing was widespread throughout northern Vietnam during this intermediate period, as well as throughout the Chinese Empire. After independence in 938 AD, chữ Hán continued to be the main script of Vietnam (along with the chữ Nôm later) until the late 19th and early 20th centuries after the successful French invasion of Vietnam, the chữ Hán (along with the chữ Nôm) after being under the rule of the French, the two scripts gradually lost its position as the main writing of the Vietnamese people.

Pronunciations for characters 

Owing to historical contact with Chinese characters before the adoption of Chinese characters and how they were adapted into Vietnamese, multiple pronunciations can exist for a single character. While most characters usually have one or two pronunciations, some characters can have up to as many as four pronunciations and more. An example of this would be the character 行 hàng – which could have the readings hàng, hành, hãng, hạng, and hạnh. The readings typically depend on the context and definition of the word. If talking about a store or goods, the reading hàng would be used, but if talking about virtue, the reading hạnh would be used. But typically, knowing what pronunciations was not a large problem due to context. Pronunciations for chữ Hán, often classified into Sino-Vietnamese pronunciations and Non-Sino-Vietnamese pronunciations. Non-Sino-Vietnamese pronunciations are derived from Old Chinese and recent Chinese contact during the 17th–20th centuries when Chinese people migrated to Vietnam. Most of these pronunciations were food related as Cantonese Chinese had introduced their food into Vietnam. Borrowings from Old Chinese are referred to as Old-Sino-Vietnamese pronunciations.

Sino-Vietnamese pronunciations (Cách đọc kiểu Hán Việt) 

Sino-Vietnamese pronunciations are usually referred to as phiên âm Hán Việt (翻音漢越), which are Vietnamese systematic pronunciations of Middle Chinese characters. These readings were largely borrowed into Vietnamese during the late Tang dynasty (618-907). Vietnamese scholars used Chinese rime dictionaries to derive consistent pronunciations for Chinese characters. After Vietnam had regained independence, its rulers sought to build the country on the Chinese model, during this time, Literary Chinese, or văn ngôn (文言), or Hán văn (漢文) was used for formal government documents. Around this, the Japanese and Koreans also borrowed large amount of characters into their languages and derived consistent pronunciations, these pronunciations are collectively known as the Sino-Xenic pronunciations.

Non-Sino-Vietnamese pronunciations (Cách đọc kiểu Phi Hán Việt) 

Non-Sino-Vietnamese pronunciations are pronunciations that were not consistently derived from Middle Chinese. Typically these readings came from Old Chinese, Cantonese, and other Chinese dialects. A lot of these pronunciations came from recent Cantonese migration to Vietnam during the 17th–20th centuries. The Cantonese eventually mostly settled down in Chợ Lớn. Where they introduced their cuisine to Vietnam. This allowed for many Cantonese words in become borrowed, most of these terms were food-related.

Nôm pronunciations (Cách đọc kiểu Nôm) 
Sometimes, characters that were phonetically close to a native Vietnamese word would be used as a chữ Nôm character. Most chữ Hán characters that were used for Vietnamese words were often used for their Sino-Vietnamese pronunciations rather than their meaning which could be completely different from the actual word being used. These characters were called chữ giả tá, due to them being borrowed phonetically. This was one reason why it was preferred to create a chữ Nôm character rather than using a chữ Hán character causing confusion between pronunciations.

Types of characters 
Chữ Hán can be classified into the traditional classification for Chinese characters, this is called lục thư (六書, Chinese: liùshū), meaning six types of Chinese characters.

 Chữ chỉ sự (𡨸指事) – Ideogram, an example would be 上 (thượng, “above”) and 下 (hạ, “below”).
 Chữ tượng hình (𡨸象形) – Pictogram, an example would be 日 (nhật, "sun") and 木 (mộc, "tree").
 Chữ hình thanh (𡨸形聲) – Phono-semantic compound, an example would be 地 (địa, "earth") which is made up of phonetic 也 (dã) and semantic 土 (thổ, "land").
 Chữ hội ý (𡨸會意) – Compound ideographs, an example would be 明 (minh, "bright") which is made up of 日 (nhật, "sun") and 月 (nguyệt, “moon”).
 Chữ chuyển chú (𡨸轉注) – Derivative cognates, least understood classification (vague classification), an example would that 老 (lão, "old") is a cognate of 考 (khảo, "to examine").
 Chữ giả tá (𡨸假借) – Phonetic loan, an example would be 法 (Pháp, "France") is used for the name of France. Other European countries are also referred by a chữ giả tá like 德 (Đức, "Germany") and 意 (Ý, "Italy").

Simplification 

Some chữ Hán characters were simplified into variants of characters that were easier to write, but they are not the same simplified characters used by current-day Chinese. This means that Vietnamese simplified characters may differ from Chinese simplified characters, for example, the word 羅 is simplified into 罗 in Chinese, but it is different in Vietnamese, 𱺵 (⿱罒𪜀).

Another example would be the character 沒 which is simplified into 没 in Chinese and 𠬠 (⿱丷又) in Vietnamese.
But some simplified characters from Chinese do exist, but these characters are rare in Vietnamese literature.

Symbols 

The character 匕 chuỷ is often used as a iteration mark to indicate the current chữ Hán character is to be repeated. This is used in words that use reduplication. Such as in the poem Lục Vân Tiên, the character 埃 (ai) is repeated twice in third line of the poem. It is written as 埃匕 to represent 埃埃 (ai ai). 

The way the marker is used, is very similar to how Chinese and Japanese use the iteration marker 々. Japanese uses 々 as an iteration marker, like for example, 人人 (hitobito) would be written as 人々 (hitobito).

See also
 Chữ Nôm
 Văn ngôn
 History of writing in Vietnam
 Chinese characters
 East Asian cultural sphere
 Kanji – Japanese equivalent of Chinese characters 
 Hanja – Korean equivalent of Chinese characters
 Sino-Vietnamese vocabulary

References

Chinese characters
East Asian culture
East Asia
Southeast Asia
Vietnamese language
Logographic writing systems
Writing systems without word boundaries